Boschloo's test is a statistical hypothesis test for analysing 2x2 contingency tables. It examines the association of two Bernoulli distributed random variables and is a uniformly more powerful alternative to Fisher's exact test. It was proposed in 1970 by R. D. Boschloo.

Setting 
A 2x2 contingency table visualizes  independent observations of two binary variables  and :

The probability distribution of such tables can be classified into three distinct cases.
 The row sums  and column sums  are fixed in advance and not random.
 The row sums  are fixed in advance but the column sums  are not.
 Only the total number  is fixed but the row sums  and the column sums  are not. Then the random vector  follows a multinomial distribution with probability vector .

Fisher's exact test is designed for the first case and therefore an exact conditional test (because it conditions on the column sums). The typical example of such a case is the Lady tasting tea: A lady tastes 8 cups of tea with milk. In 4 of those cups the milk is poured in before the tea. In the other 4 cups the tea is poured in first. The lady tries to assign the cups to the two categories. Following our notation, the random variable  represents the used method (1 = milk first, 0 = milk last) and  represents the lady's guesses (1 = milk first guessed, 0 = milk last guessed). Then the row sums are the fixed numbers of cups prepared with each method: . The lady knows that there are 4 cups in each category, so will assign 4 cups to each method. Thus, the column sums are also fixed in advance: .

Boschloo's test is designed for the second case and therefore an exact unconditional test. Examples of such a case are often found in medical research, where a binary endpoint is compared between two patient groups. Following our notation,  represents the first group that receives some medication of interest.  represents the second group that receives a placebo.  indicates the cure of a patient (1 = cure, 0 = no cure). Then the row sums equal the group sizes and are usually fixed in advance. The column sums are the total number of cures respectively disease continuations and not fixed in advance.

If we count the number of results in our 2x2 table (1 = head, 0 = tail), we neither know in advance how often coin  shows head or tail (row sums random), nor do we know how often coin  shows head or tail (column sums random).

Test hypothesis 
The null hypothesis of Boschloo's one-tailed test (high values of  favor the alternative hypothesis) is:

The null hypothesis of the one-tailed test can also be formulated in the other direction (small values of  favor the alternative hypothesis):

The null hypothesis of the two-tailed test is:

There is no universal definition of the two-tailed version of Fisher's exact test. Since Boschloo's test is based on Fisher's exact test, a universal two-tailed version of Boschloo's test also doesn't exist.

Boschloo's idea 
Fisher's exact test is a conditional test and appropriate for the first of the above mentioned cases. But if we treat the observed column sum  as fixed in advance, Fisher's exact test can also be applied to the second case. This leads to an undesirable loss of power.

Boschloo proposed to use Fisher's exact test with a greater nominal level . Here,  should be chosen as large as possible such that the maximal size is still controlled by : . This made performing Boschloo's test computationally easy.

Test statistic 
The decision rule of Boschloo's approach is based on Fisher's exact test. An equivalent way of formulating the test is to use the p-value of Fisher's exact test as test statistic. Fisher's p-value is calculated from the hypergeometric distribution (for ease of notation we write  instead of ):

The critical value  is equal to the nominal level of Boschloo's original approach.

Modification 
Boschloo's test deals with the unknown nuisance parameter  by taking the maximum over the whole parameter space .
 is usually a small value such as 0.001 or 0.0001. This results in a modified Boschloo's test which is also exact.

Comparison to other exact tests 
All exact tests hold the specified significance level but can have varying power in different situations. Mehrotra et al. compared the power of some exact tests in different situations. The results regarding Boschloo's test are summarized in the following.

Modified Boschloo's test 
Boschloo's test and the modified Boschloo's test have similar power in all considered scenarios. Boschloo's test has slightly more power in some cases, and vice versa in some other cases.

Fisher's exact test 
Boschloo's test is by construction uniformly more powerful than Fisher's exact test. For small sample sizes (e.g. 10 per group) the power difference is large, ranging from 16 to 20 percentage points in the regarded cases. The power difference is smaller for greater sample sizes.

Exact -Pooled test 
This test is based on the test statistic

The power of this test is similar to that of Boschloo's test in most scenarios. In some cases, the -Pooled test has greater power, with differences mostly ranging from 1 to 5 percentage points. In very few cases, the difference goes up to 9 percentage points. 

This test can also be modified by the Berger & Boos procedure. However, the resulting test has very similar power to the unmodified test in all scenarios.

Exact -Unpooled test 
This test is based on the test statistic

where  are the group event rates.

The power of this test is similar to that of Boschloo's test in many scenarios. In some cases, the -Unpooled test has greater power, with differences ranging from 1 to 5 percentage points. However, in some other cases, Boschloo's test has noticeably greater power, with differences up to 68 percentage points.

This test can also be modified by the Berger & Boos procedure. The resulting test has similar power to the unmodified test in most scenarios. In some cases, the power is considerably improved by the modification but the overall power comparison to Boschloo's test remains unchanged.

Software 
The calculation of Boschloo's test can be performed in following software:
 The function scipy.stats.boschloo_exact from SciPy
 Packages Exact and exact2x2 of the programming language R
 StatXact

See also 
 Fisher's exact test
 Barnard's test

References 

Statistical tests for contingency tables
Nonparametric statistics